The 1993–94 FA Trophy was the twenty-fifth season of the FA Trophy.

First qualifying round

Ties

Replays

2nd replays

Second qualifying round

Ties

Replays

Third qualifying round

Ties

Replays

1st round
The teams that given byes to this round are Halifax Town, Bromsgrove Rovers, Dagenham & Redbridge, Yeovil Town, Slough Town, Stafford Rangers, Bath City, Woking, Kidderminster Harriers, Altrincham, Northwich Victoria, Stalybridge Celtic, Kettering Town, Gateshead, Telford United, Merthyr Tydfil, Witton Albion, Macclesfield Town, Runcorn, Welling United, Dover Athletic, Southport, Farnborough Town, Boston United, Marine, Winsford United, Morecambe, Chesham United, Sutton United, Grays Athletic, Warrington Town and Whitby Town.

Ties

Replays

2nd replay

2nd round

Ties

Replays

3rd round

Ties

Replays

4th round

Ties

Replays

Semi finals

First leg

Second leg

Replay

Final

Tie

References

General
 Football Club History Database: FA Trophy 1993-94

Specific

1993–94 domestic association football cups
League
1993-94